The Super Rink at National Sports Center is a  ice rink facility that features eight sheets of ice and is the largest ice arena complex in the world. It is located on the National Sports Center campus in Blaine, Minnesota, a northern suburb of Minneapolis – Saint Paul.

Facility
The Super Rink was constructed in two stages with a total cost of $21 million, with funding of just $1 million from State of Minnesota grants. The remainder of the funding comes from the partner organizations. Revenue from ice rentals covers the annual construction bond obligation. The Super Rink was a combined project of the Minnesota Amateur Sports Commission (MASC), The Herb Brooks Foundation, National Sports Center, Bethel University, and eleven local hockey organizations, which are Arden Hills, Blaine, Centerville, Circle Pines, Forest Lake Coon Rapids, Centennial, Lino Lakes, Mounds View, New Brighton, and Shoreview. Ramsey County and Anoka County also helped in funding. The Super Rink since its construction has not received any additional funding; it is completely self-sufficient through private ice rentals and in-house programs. The original facility, constructed by Shingobee Builders, opened in 1998 and included four Olympic-regulation-sized ice sheets (100 × 200 ft):
 Rink #1 - Coon Rapids Arena
 Rink #2 - Blaine Arena
 Rink #3 - Minnesota Amateur Sports Commission/Centennial Arena
 Rink #4 - Ramsey County Arena

The Super Rink was expanded in 2006; the expansion included the Herb Brooks Training Center, a figure skating training room, concession area, 32 locker rooms and four NHL regulation-sized ice sheets (85 × 200 ft):
 Rink #5 - Bethel University Arena
 Rink #6 - Herb Brooks Foundation Arena
 Rink #7 - Blaine Youth Hockey Arena
 Rink #8 - Centennial Youth Hockey Arena

Herb Brooks Training Center
The Herb Brooks Training Center (HBTC) is a state of the art hockey training center that was part of the Super Rink expansion that occurred in 2006. The HBTC was created to improve the game of hockey through proper player development via off-ice and on-ice skills training protocols. The facility has many off-ice hockey specific training stations, including a skating treadmill. The HBTC is run and operated by the Flexx Hockey Institute of Training (FHIT). FHIT offers memberships to the HBTC and year-round training programs.

Events and programs
The Super Rink hosts a number of ice sport events year round, including: ice hockey, speed skating, figure skating, broomball, recreational ice skating, and off-ice training at the Herb Brooks Training Center.

The Super Rink  is home to various youth, high school, and adult ice hockey teams and is also home to U.S. Women's National Hockey Team and the Bethel University Royals men's and women's ice hockey teams competing at the NCAA Division III level in the Minnesota Intercollegiate Athletic Conference (MIAC).

The Super Rink hosts a number of events throughout the year including:
 Schwan Cup Hockey Tournament
 Stick-It to Cancer Women and Girls Tournament
 The Rush 3v3 Festival
 Walleye Chop Adult Tournament
 All-American Girls and Women Hockey Tournament
 The Cup Adult Tournament
 USA International Hockey Tournament
 Ironman Adult Tournament
 Minnesota Wild Adult Hockey League
 Wal-Mart Hockey Cup 3v3 Tournament
 Super Rink Spectacular
 Wal-Mart Hockey Cup High School Festival
 AARP Senior Hockey Championship
 2010 ACHA Women's Ice Hockey Championship Tournament
 ISI World Figure Skating Championships
 North American Hockey League Showcase Tournament
 US National Sport Track Speedskating Championship
 2001 Women's World Hockey Championship
 Minnesota Sports Federation's Indoor State Brooomball Championships
 USA & Global Broomball Championships

Home of the U.S. Women's National Team

In 2008, USA Hockey, the national governing body for hockey in the U.S., named the Schwan Super Rink as the home of the Women's National Team. The team trained in residence at the facility for two years leading up to the 2010 Winter Olympics. That team was coached by Mark Johnson, who played on the 1980 "Miracle on Ice" gold medal team from the 1980 Lake Placid Olympics. The U.S. team won the silver medal in Vancouver, losing to archrival Canada 2–0 in the gold medal game. Since the Olympic Games, Team USA has returned to their training home at the Super Rink at least twice a year for training and team selection camps, with the most recent camp being held in August 2011.

Hockey
The Super Rink offers many Ice Hockey programs. With a full  experienced and professional staff they program and work year-round on leagues, tournaments and development programs. Offering programs for all levels and ages of hockey players, both male and female.

Figure Skating
The Super Rink is host for the Schwan Super Rink Skating School and the Northern Blades National Sports Center Figure Skating Club. Figure skaters are able to utilize a  dance & fitness center, this dry land training facility was built during the expansion of the Schwan Super Rink in 2006.

References

External links
 Official site
 Schwan Super Rink-RinkTime

Indoor arenas in Minnesota
College ice hockey venues in the United States
Buildings and structures in Anoka County, Minnesota
Tourist attractions in Anoka County, Minnesota
1998 establishments in Minnesota
Indoor ice hockey venues in Minneapolis–Saint Paul
Ice hockey in Minnesota
Sports in Blaine, Minnesota
Sports venues completed in 1998